Swallowfield Park is a Grade II* listed stately home and estate in the English county of Berkshire. The house is near the village of Swallowfield, some 4 miles south of the town of Reading.

The House 

Swallowfield Park was the home of the Backhouse family from the late 16th century, who had lived in a now demolished Tudor mansion. The most famous member of this family was of William Backhouse, the Rosicrucian philosopher. The present house at Swallowfield Park was erected in 1689 by Henry Hyde, 2nd Earl of Clarendon, when he acquired the estate on his marriage to William Backhouse's daughter Flower. The architect was William Talman, "comptroller of the works" to William III. Talman built an H-shaped house with short projections to the front and more extended ones to the rear. The house was the childhood home of Edward Hyde, 3rd Earl of Clarendon.

In 1717, Thomas 'Diamond' Pitt, the Governor of Fort St. George, bought Swallowfield Park from Edward Hyde, reputedly using part of the proceeds of his sale of the Regent Diamond to Philippe II, Duke of Orléans. The Pitt family sold the property to John Dodd for £20,000, and it remained in that family till purchased in 1783 by Silvanus Bevan.  The sale, at Christie's, lasted seven days and included a large number of magnificent pictures and objets d'art.  After a quarrel with a neighbour about shooting rights Bevan sold the property in 1789. The Bevan crest, a griffin, still remains over the stone carved mantelpiece in the Hall.

The house was bought in 1820 by Sir Henry Russell, Chief Justice of Bengal in India, who employed William Atkinson to undertake many adaptations and alterations to the house. Internally, little of Talman's house survives as a result of these changes.  A new staircase was installed, which resulted in the removal of a carved cornice made for the Earl of Clarendon by Grinling Gibbons. In 1852 the house was inherited by his grandson, Sir Charles Russell VC.

In 1923 the house was recorded as containing many fine portraits, including George Romney's painting of Lady Russell and son (1786–87), of Michael Russell (1785) and of Henry Russell; portraits of the Shelley family, Captain the Hon. William Fitzwilliam, Mr. Benyon and Mrs. Beard by Hogarth; George Richmond's portraits of Sir Henry Russell, bart., and of Charles Russell, afterwards third baronet, and another portrait of the same by Sir John Millais. At this time, the library held a large collection of books and many treasures, including Dr. Dee's magic mirror.

The house was purchased by the Country Houses Association about 1975 and refurbished to provide retirement flats with communal living areas. After the CHA went into liquidation in 2003 the mansion was acquired by property developers, Sunley Heritage, and converted into self-contained apartments.

The Gardens
The gardens were visited and described by John Evelyn, who wrote much about 'the delicious and rarest fruits,' the 'innumerable timber trees in the ground about the seate,' the walks and groves of elms, limes, oaks and other trees, the quarters, walks and parterres, nurseries, kitchen garden, two very noble orangeries, and, 'above all, the canall and fishponds, the one fed with a white, the other with a black running water,' stocked with pike, carp, bream and tench.

References

Gamble, Audrey Nona. A History of the Bevan Family, 1923.
'Parishes: Swallowfield', A History of the County of Berkshire Volume 3 (1923), pp. 267–274.

External links
Royal Berkshire History: Swallowfield Park
Sunley Heritage - apartments marketing
University of Warwick Study of Swallowfield Park's East India Company Links

Country houses in Berkshire
Grade II* listed buildings in Berkshire
Grade II* listed houses
Houses completed in 1689
William Talman buildings
Swallowfield